The Peugeot Inception is a electric concept car produced by French car manufacturer Peugeot and presented at the 2023 Consumer Electronics Show.

Presentation 
The Inception was unveiled by Carlos Tavares during the presentation of Stellantis at CES 2023.

Specifications 
The Inception is based on the future STLA Large platform, dedicated to the group's electric vehicles, with which the next electric Peugeot 3008 will be equipped.

References 

Inception
Cars introduced in 2023